The First Buhl cabinet was the government of Denmark from 4 May 1942 to 9 November 1942. It was created following the death of Prime Minister Thorvald Stauning.

List of ministers
Some periods in the table below start before 8 July 1940 or end after 4 May 1942 because the minister was in the Sixth Stauning Cabinet or the Scavenius Cabinet as well.

The cabinet consisted of:

References

1942 establishments in Denmark
1942 disestablishments in Denmark
Buhl I